Pierre Guy Maubouché is a French actor, voiceover artist, producer and casting director. As a visual actor, he has contributed to several movies, including The Last Horror Movie, but he is better known within the industry for his voiceover skills and contributions. Among the better-known projects to which he contributed are the worldwide Dolce & Gabbaba Light Blue Pour Homme television advertising campaign; the cult English TV commercial for Stella Artois, "The Hero's Return", in which all the male voices (besides the main characters') are his; the similarly cult Lynx (Axe) commercial for French television; and the character Raven in the French version of the game Metal Gear Solid. Many other projects are listed on his website, . Maubouché has also done voiceover work with the Blue Man Group on the How To Be a Megastar Tour, and provided vocals for the Schiller song Soleil De Nuit. He is the voice of Discovery Channel (France) and ESPN (France), and appears very regularly as a promo/ident voice on Sky, National Geographic Channel, CNN and MTV.

He has also contributed as a dubbing actor to the following movies:
 Vantage Point
 Casino Royale
 Botched
 Bon Voyage
 Hannibal Rising
 Children of Men
 The Queen
 The Da Vinci Code
 Munich
 Soundproof
 Kingdom of Heaven
 Master and Commander: The Far Side of the World
 Flyboys: A True Story of Courage
 Hotel Rwanda
 Troy
 Shooting Dogs
 Vanity Fair
 Phantom of The Opera
 Around the World in 80 Days
 Legionnaire

As a producer and casting director, he specialises in sourcing and casting actors (voiceover artists or visual actors) for the advertising and broadcast industries through Sounds Beautiful

References 

1963 births
Living people
French male film actors
French male voice actors